Train Does Led Zeppelin II is the ninth studio album by American rock band Train of Led Zeppelin songs. This album covers Led Zeppelin II in its entirety. The album was performed in concert and was released digitally as well as on compact disc and vinyl. All profits from sales of the album went to the San Francisco-based charity, Family House.

Track listing

Personnel
 Pat Monahan – lead vocals
 Luis Maldonado – lead guitar, 12 string electric guitar, acoustic
 Jerry Becker – acoustic guitar, electric guitar, Hammond B3, harmonica
 Hector Maldonado – bass
 Drew Shoals – drums, percussion
 Nikita Houston – backing vocals

Charts

References

2016 albums
Led Zeppelin tribute albums
Train (band) albums
Covers albums